A plebiscite was held in British Togoland on 9 May 1956 to decide the status of the territory. Since World War I, the territory had been a League of Nations mandate under British control, and became a United Nations Trust Territory after World War II. The referendum offered residents the choice of remaining a Trust Territory until neighbouring French Togoland had decided upon its future, or becoming part of soon-to-be Ghana. The Ewe-based Togoland Congress campaigned against and preferred amalgamation with French Togoland.

The eventual result was reported to be 58% in favour of integration, although 55% of voters in the southern part of the territory had voted to separate from the Gold Coast and continue its status as a UN Trusteeship.

Results

See also
Western Togoland

References

British Togoland
1956 in Gold Coast (British colony)
Referendums in Ghana
1956 election
Sovereignty referendums
1956 elections in the British Empire